Amalda edgariana is a species of sea snail, a marine gastropod mollusk in the family Ancillariidae.

Description

Distribution

References

External links
 Schepman M.M. (1911) The Prosobranchia of the Siboga Expedition. Part IV. Rachiglossa. Siboga-Expeditie, 49d: 247–363, pls. 18–24. Leiden, E.J. Brill

edgariana
Gastropods described in 1911